Thomas Hosmer Shepherd (16 January 1793, France – 1864) was a British topographical watercolour artist well known for his architectural paintings.

Life and work
Thomas was the brother of topographical artist George "Sidney" Shepherd, Thomas was employed to illustrate architecture in London, and later Edinburgh, Bath and Bristol. His paintings were the basis for steel engravings in many books (see bibliography).

Shepherd's work, mostly topographical, is characterized by an attention to detail, along with lifelike scenes that contained people, carriages and horses. His first acclaim came with Metropolitan improvements, a publication of modern London architecture commissioned by the publisher Jones & Co. He worked mostly for Frederick Crace, who employed him to paint old London buildings prior to their demolition, with much of the work surviving in the Crace collection at the British Museum.

Shepherd lived in Batchelor Street, Islington, North London. His residency is marked by a commemorative plaque.

References

Attribution

Selected bibliography
 T. H. Shepherd & James Elmes. Metropolitan improvements: London in the nineteenth century (London: Jones & Co. 1827).
 John Britton & T. H. Shepherd. Modern Athens displayed in a series of views or Edinburgh in the 19th century (Jones & Co., 1829).
 T. H. Shepherd & James Elmes. London and its Environs in the Nineteenth Century (London: Jones & Co. 1831).
 John Britton & T. H. Shepherd. Bath and Bristol, with the counties of Somerset and Gloucester, displayed in a series of views, including the modern improvements, picturesque scenery, antiquities, etc. (London, W. Evans, 1831?).
 T. H. Shepherd. London Interiors (London: D. Omer Smith, 1841?)

External links

 T H Shepherd on Artnet
 Paintings by T H Shepherd (Bridgeman Art Library)
  View of the Bank of England (1816 aquatint)
 London Docks, looking west (1831 engraving)

1793 births
1864 deaths
19th-century English painters
English male painters
English watercolourists
English illustrators
Landscape artists
19th-century English male artists